52 is a weekly American comic book limited series published by DC Comics that debuted on May 10, 2006, one week after the conclusion of the Infinite Crisis miniseries. The series was written by Geoff Johns, Grant Morrison, Greg Rucka, and Mark Waid, with layouts by Keith Giffen. 52 also led into a few limited series spin-offs.

52 consists of 52 issues, published weekly for one year, each issue detailing an actual week chronicling the events that took place during the missing year after the end of Infinite Crisis. The series covers much of the DC Universe, and several characters whose disparate stories interconnect. The story is directly followed by the weekly limited series Countdown to Final Crisis.  It was the first weekly series published by DC Comics since the short-lived anthology Action Comics Weekly in 1988–1989.

Format
The use of a weekly publication format is unusual in the North American comics industry, traditionally based upon a monthly publication. 52 and Batman Eternal (2014/2015) both hold the top position, of being the longest-published serialised weekly comic, published by a major North American publisher. The record was previously held by Action Comics Weekly. The story was originally conceived as being a chronicle of what happened in the "missing year" between the end of Infinite Crisis and the beginning of One Year Later. It would especially focus on how the world dealt with the disappearance of the "big three" heroes in the DCU, Superman, Batman, and Wonder Woman. As the series went on, it became more of a platform for which to set the stage for upcoming storylines in the DC Universe.

Back-up stories

History of the DC Universe
A backup story titled History of the DC Universe appears in Weeks 2 through 11, with the creative team of Dan Jurgens and Art Thibert. Reminiscent of DC's earlier History of the DC Universe limited series, in this story, Donna Troy explores the history of the DC Universe with the help of Harbinger's recording device. In the final chapter, both the device and a Monitor inform Donna Troy that she was supposed to have died instead of Jade.

Secret Origins
Weeks 12 through 51 feature Secret Origins, written by Mark Waid with a rotating team of artists.

Plot

In the aftermath of Infinite Crisis, Clark Kent, Bruce Wayne, and Diana Prince temporarily retire their costumed identities and do not attend a memorial for Superboy in Metropolis. Time traveler Booster Gold is shocked to not see the three heroes there, as this contradicts Skeets' historical data. Other contradictions, prompt Booster to search for answers in time traveler Rip Hunter's bunker, which is littered with notes and photos of Gold and Skeets surrounded by the words "his fault". Booster later discovers that his reputation and fame is diminishing. He tries to regain the spotlight by containing an exploding nuclear submarine, but seemingly dies in the attempt. Skeets regains access to Hunter's lab and realizes the photos and arrows are pointing at himself. He goes after Hunter and eventually finds him with Booster Gold, who turns out to have faked his death to help uncover Skeets' true intentions. Hunter and Booster attempt to trap Skeets in the Phantom Zone, but Skeets appears to consume the sub-dimension and pursues his two adversaries through time.

Ralph Dibny, the Elongated Man, is told that the gravestone of his dead wife Sue has been vandalized with an inverted Kryptonian "S", a symbol for resurrection. This was done by a cult that believes that Superboy can be resurrected, but would like to try first with Sue. Dibny and his friends disrupt the ceremony, and the effigy of Sue crawls to Dibny, calling out to him as it burns; he suffers a nervous breakdown as a result. Ralph seeks out the helmet of Doctor Fate, which promises to revive Sue if he makes certain sacrifices. While preparing a spell for Nabu, Dibny reveals the helmet is not the one talking to him, but sorcerer Felix Faust. Faust was posing as Nabu to give Dibny's soul to the demon Neron in exchange for his freedom. Neron kills Dibny, but realizes too late that Dibny's spell has trapped him and Faust inside a circle of binding. With Ralph's death, Neron and Faust are seemingly trapped together for all eternity. Ralph and Sue Dibny are reunited in death and become ghost detectives.

Lex Luthor announces the Everyman Project, a program designed to give ordinary people superpowers. Natasha Irons (Steel) wants to join the Project, but her uncle John Henry Iron forbids it. She enrolls anyway and becomes a member of Luthor's superhero team Infinity, Inc. During a battle, Luthor deactivates the powers of one of Natasha's teammates with fatal results. The death of her friend prompts Natasha to question Luthor's motives. Angered by reports that he is incompatible with the treatment, Luthor deactivates the powers of the majority of the Everyman subjects, resulting in many of them falling from the sky to their deaths. After learning the reports were falsified, he gives himself the powers of Superman. John and the Teen Titans attack Lexcorp and bring him to justice with Natasha's help. Beast Boy offers Natasha membership in the Teen Titans, but she declines in favor of forming a new team with her uncle.

Animal Man, Starfire, and Adam Strange are marooned on an alien planet after the events of Infinite Crisis. They are pursued through space by agents of Lady Styx, whose forces are conquering and overrunning planets on a path of destruction toward Earth. With some help from Lobo, the Emerald Eye of Ekron and the Emerald Head of Ekron, the heroes defeat Lady Styx. During the fight, Animal Man dies. The aliens who gave him his powers later revive him with new powers. He now has the ability to gain powers from any sentient being in the universe. He uses it to return to Earth.

Black Adam, the superhuman leader of Kahndaq, forges a coalition with several other countries against the United States and their metahumans: the Freedom of Power Treaty. He stops when Adrianna Tomaz, a former slave, shows him how he can use his abilities more peacefully to help his country. Adam convinces Captain Marvel to give Tomaz the power of Isis. Adam and Isis free enslaved children across Africa. The Question and Renee Montoya, meanwhile, start investigating Intergang. Following a lead, they fly to Kahndaq and prevent a suicide bombing at Black Adam and Isis' wedding. Adam awards them one of Kahndaq's highest honors. The four uncover Intergang, which is inducting children into a religion of crime based on its Crime Bible. Black Adam finds Isis' crippled brother Amon among the children and shares his power with him. Amon is reborn as Osiris. Osiris befriends a seemingly timid anthropomorphic crocodile named Sobek, who joins Black Adam's Black Marvel Family. Adam and Isis inform the Freedom of Power Treaty member nations that Kahndaq is no longer interested in consolidating power or in executing superhumans.

Will Magnus, creator of the Metal Men, is abducted to Oolong Island, where Intergang and Chang Tzu force kidnapped scientists to develop new weapons for them. There, Magnus is ordered to build a Plutonium Man robot. The scientists activate three of their Four Horsemen, which target Black Adam. Suspicious of him, Amanda Waller maneuvers Osiris into killing the Persuader and leaking footage of the incident to the media. With his reputation destroyed, Osiris retires from the public eye and acid rain ravages Kahndaq. Convinced that he is the cause of Kahndaq's new miseries, Osiris asks Captain Marvel to remove his powers. Isis and Black Adam stop him and the three return to Kahndaq. Sobek tricks Osiris into turning back into Amon and devours him, revealing himself to be the fourth Horseman, Famine. The other Horsemen join the battle. Isis is poisoned by Pestilence and dies while asking Adam to avenge her and Osiris' deaths.

Grief-stricken and enraged to the point of madness, Black Adam destroys the country of Bialya, base of the Four Horsemen, murdering the country's entire population. He then attacks Oolong Island. The Justice Society of America invade the island to arrest him and subdue the scientists, but Adam escapes and embarks on a week-long rampage across the globe, during which he kills several superhumans. Captain Marvel convinces the Egyptian pantheon to revert Adam to Teth-Adam and changes Adam's magic word from "Shazam" to a new phrase. Teth-Adam goes missing in the resulting explosion and wanders the Earth powerlessly, trying to guess the secret word.

The Question and Montoya train with Richard Dragon in Nanda Parbat, where Montoya learns that the Question is dying from lung cancer and wants her to replace him. After they discover a prophecy in the Crime Bible about Batwoman's death, the two join her fight against Intergang in Gotham City. When the Question's condition worsens, Montoya journeys back to Nanda Parbat in a failed attempt to save his life. Shortly after they leave Gotham, Intergang discovers Batwoman's identity and attempts to sacrifice her to fulfill the prophecy. Montoya, as the new Question, tries to save Batwoman, who gets stabbed by Mannheim with a ceremonial dagger. Batwoman fatally wounds Mannheim and survives. After she recovers, Montoya shines the restored Bat-Signal to call her back to work.

Skeets is revealed to be Mister Mind, who has been using Skeets' metallic body as a cocoon to metamorphose into a gigantic, monstrous form that feeds on time itself. Rip Hunter and Booster escape to the end of the Infinite Crisis and witness the secret creation of 52 identical parallel universes. Mister Mind intends to consume them. The Phantom Zone is restored, and Mister Mind alters events in the 52 universes, creating new histories and a new status quo for each. The heroes trap him in the remains of Skeets' shell and send him back in time to the beginning of the year, where he is captured by Dr. Sivana, trapped in a time loop for all eternity. Will Magnus later rebuilds Skeets, using a copy he had made of the robot's memories.

World War III

Week 50 of 52 and the four-issue World War III limited series, which was released the same week, depict the superhumans' battle with Black Adam. World War III also depicts Aquaman's transformation into the Dweller of the Depths, Martian Manhunter's change in outlook, Donna Troy's assumption of the Wonder Woman mantle, Supergirl's return to the 21st century, Jason Todd pretending to be Nightwing, and Cassandra Cain being drugged to turn evil and join Deathstroke.

Science Squad 
The Science Squad are a group of fictional scientists and mad scientists in the DC Comics Universe. The group was created by writer Grant Morrison who stated: "I love writing cowardly, petulant, irascible supervillains much more than I enjoy writing truly evil ones, so this whole plot strand was a joy from beginning to end". The members of the team are Veronica Cale, Doctor Death, Doctor Sivana, I.Q., Will Magnus, T.O. Morrow, Komrade Krabb, Dr. Tyme, and Robby Reed enemies Doctor Cyclops, Baron Bug, and Dr. Rigoro Mortis. They are commanded by Chang Tzu. They are featured prominently throughout the series, particularly in Week 46.

Secret message
Dan DiDio included a hidden message in his "DC Nation" column in the back of Week 37. The message is spelled out using the first letter of every third word: "the secret of fifty-two is that the multiverse still exists".

Collected editions
The lead stories of the series are collected, with commentary from the creators and other extras, into four trade paperbacks:

 Volume 1 (collects #1–13, 304 pages, May 2007)
 Volume 2 (collects #14–26, 304 pages, July 2007)
 Volume 3 (collects #27–39, 304 pages, September 2007)
 Volume 4 (collects #40–52, 304 pages, November 2007)

All 52 issues were also available in the 52 Omnibus hardcover (1,216 pages, November 2012).

The collection has also been made available in a two-volume edition that includes bonus material after each chapter:

 Volume 1 (collects #1–26, 584 pages, June 2015)
 Volume 2 (collects #27–52, 616 pages, January 2017)

Other connected collections include:

 52: The Companion (224 pages, October 2007)
 DC: World War III (collects 52 Week 50 and the entire four-issue World War III limited series, 128 pages, December 2007)
 52 Aftermath: The Four Horsemen (Collects #1–6, 144 pages, May 2008 )
 The Question: The Five Books of Blood (collects "Crime Bible – Five Lessons of Blood" #1–5, 128 pages, June 2009)
 Wizard #184

Spin-offs
Taking advantage of the popularity of the series, DC issued several series of comics based on the individual threads of 52 that began several months after 52 ended. Booster Gold (vol. 2) is an ongoing series that sees the eponymous hero and Rip Hunter travel through time to fix history as "the greatest superhero never known". The six-issue 52 Aftermath: The Four Horsemen miniseries covers the Four Horsemen's battle with Superman, Batman, and Wonder Woman. Black Adam: The Dark Age, another six-issue miniseries, follows Teth-Adam's quest to restore his powers and bring Isis back to life; it takes place between the end of 52 and Mary Marvel's corruption in Countdown to Final Crisis.

Two strands of the 52 story were taken and put together with back-ups from the new Countdown to Final Crisis story. Countdown to Adventure looks at the fate of space-travelers Adam Strange, Animal Man, and Starfire in their new roles after their journey over the course of eight issues, with a back-up story following Forerunner. Countdown to Mystery is another eight-issue series looking at the new Doctor Fate and a back-up story focusing on Eclipso.

These include:
 Booster Gold vol. 2 #1–47 – The further adventures of Booster Gold, Supernova, and Rip Hunter as they try to preserve the fractured timeline.
 Black Adam: The Dark Age #1–6 – In the aftermath of World War III, Black Adam tries to recoup his losses, for both his powers and his personal life.
 Infinity Inc. #1–12 – Steel and the remaining members of Luthor's Everyman Project team together to form a new Infinity Inc.
 52 Aftermath: Crime Bible – Five Lessons of Blood #1–5 – The Question and Batwoman investigate crimes, leading them deeper into the Crime Bible.
 52 Aftermath: The Four Horsemen #1–6 – Follows Superman, Batman, and Wonder Woman against the Four Horsemen of Apokolips.
 Metal Men #1–8 – Follows Dr. William "Will" Magnus and the new version of the Metal Men as they battle Will's brother, David, who wants to destroy them.
 Detective Comics – Follows Batwoman and the Question.
 The Great Ten #1–9 – Follows the Chinese superteam.

In other media

Action figures
In September 2006, DC Direct premiered a line of action figures based on 52. The first wave, featuring figures based on Batwoman, Isis, Booster Gold, Animal Man, and Supernova, was released in May 2007.

Novelization
Ace Books, under the imprint of the Berkley Publishing Group and published by the Penguin Group, released a novelization written by Greg Cox, with cover art by J. G. Jones and Alex Sinclair, and its design by George Brewer.

The novel primarily adapts the weekly limited series and the World War III tie-in miniseries. The novel deals with the plotlines of Montoya, the Question, Black Adam, Booster Gold, Skeets, and the 52 Earths, dropping the Luthor/Steel/Everyman Project, Ralph Dibny, and space plotlines completely and including only part of the "Science Squad" storyline, keeping in the evil geniuses and their work for Intergang but leaving out Will Magnus' ongoing plot; in his introduction, Cox explains that it was not possible to adapt all the plotlines of 52 within a novel of reasonable length. Outside of the loss of these various storylines from the book, events play out in an essentially identical manner, with most of the dialogue itself even lifted from the comics verbatim. There are some minor cosmetic changes along the way (for instance, on Week 3, Black Adam kills Intergang thug Rough House as opposed to Terra-Man), but in the final chapter, a lot of the specifics of Mister Mind's cross-time battle with Rip Hunter, Booster Gold, and Supernova are altered. The villain reveals himself in front of a gathered group of heroes in Metropolis, rather than to just Booster and Rip in the Fortress of Solitude; the rebirth of the multiverse is credited to Mister Mind's transformation, rather than the Crisis; and the weapon stolen from Steel by Booster during World War III is actually put to use against Mind, which it was not in the comic, and is the cause of his unexplained-in-the-comic shrinking.

Audiobook
In December 2007, GraphicAudio released the first half of a full cast audiobook adaptation based on the novel by Greg Cox. Like GraphicAudio's audiobook of Infinite Crisis, this spans two volumes (each 6 hours long) with 6 CDs and features a full cast, music, and sound effects. Volume 2 was released in February 2008.

Voice cast credits as follows:
 Ken Jackson : Black Adam, Skeets, Mr. Mind
 Barbara Pinolini : Renee Montoya
 Bruce Rauscher : The Question, Phantom Stranger, Dr. Cyclops, Leonard Akteon
 Colleen Delany : Isis, Wonder Woman, Superwoman
 David Coyne : Booster Gold, Boss Mannheim, Daniel Carter, Captain Boomerang, Beefeater
 James Konicek : Clark Kent, Count Vertigo, First Beast-man
 Nanette Savard : Lois Lane, Whisper A’Daire, Zalika
 M.B. Van Dorn : Katherine Kane, Batwoman
 Michael Glenn : Osiris, Richard Dragon, Hourman, Beastboy
 Terence Aselford : Captain Marvel, Jay Garrick, Captain Marvel Jr., Mind-Grabber Kid
 Susan Lynskey : Mary Marvel, Plastique, Madame Xanadu
 James Lewis : Nightwing, Kyle Abbot, Baron Bug, Agent Rogers, Jimmy Olsen
 Karen Carbone : Power Girl, Claudia Lanpher
 Ted Stoddard : Aristotle Rodor
 Eric Messner : Atom-Smasher, Dr. Death
 Erika Rose : Amanda Waller, Natasha Irons
 Michael John Casey : Persuader, Dr. Kim, Zorrm
 Elisabeth Demery : Zatanna, Stargirl, Mallory, Veronica Cale
 Jeff Baker : Alan Scott
 Elliot Dash : Mr.Terrific, Steel
 Dylan Lynch : Waverider, Col. Harjvati, Electrocutioner
 Thomas Penny : , Rigoro Mortis, News Anchor, Black Lightning, Bike Boy
 Tim Carlin : Perry White, Jim Corrigan, Benny the Mover
 Cate Torre : Lady Sivana, Mildred Heiny, Yellow Peri, Carjack Lady
 Jim Lawson : Metamorpho, Louie the Mover, Fred Farrell, Panic Dad
 Arianne Parker : Firehawk, Firefighter, Kahndaqi woman
 Christopher Graybill : T.O.Morrow, Roggra, Noose, Mirage
 Michael Replogle : Dr.Tyme, Manthrax
 Christopher Walker : Strauss, Kahndaqi dissident, Aged servant
 Jacinda Bronaugh : Vicki Vale, Bobbi Bobbins
 Richard Rohan : Dr. Sivana, Rip Hunter, Sabbac, Azraeuz, The Blimp
 Mort Shelby : Sobek, Wildcat, Mammoth, Tawky Tawny, Rough House

The Flash
In the CW series The Flash, the term '52' is often used as an Easter egg. For example, in the episode "Things You Can't Outrun", the Flash team opt to incarcerate criminal metahumans in "Area 52" at S.T.A.R. Labs. In the second season, inter-dimensional breaches are made between Earth-One and Earth-Two, and 52 separate portals are located.

See also
 Countdown to Final Crisis
 List of DC Comics publications
 The New 52

References

External links
 
 DC's official website devoted to 52
 Andrew Dowdell's Complete 52 Coverage and Annotations: 52 Pickup, Silver Bullet Comics, December 29, 2006
 Dan Didio spills on DC's 52, Newsarama, December 23, 2005
 Crisis Counseling Supplemental Interview with Dan Didio on 52, Newsarama, December 23, 2005
 52 Weeks #1–5 online
 Issue summaries – Full plot summaries
 An audio preview of the audiobook by GraphicAudio

2006 comics debuts
2007 comics endings
Comics by Keith Giffen
Infinite Crisis
Comics by Geoff Johns
Comics by Mark Waid
Comics by Greg Rucka
Defunct American comics
Comics about parallel universes
Comic book reboots